Six Songs may refer to:

Music

Classical compositions
A number of compositions by Charles Gounod (1818–1893)
A number of compositions by Alexander von Zemlinsky (1871–1942)
A number of compositions by Ludwig van Beethoven (1770–1827)
A number of compositions by Edvard Grieg (1843–1907)
A number of compositions by Jean Sibelius (1865 – 1957)
A number of compositions by Paul Hindemith (1895–1963)
A number of compositions by Max Reger (1873–1916)
Six Songs, Op. 8 (1868–1870), by Nikolai Rimsky-Korsakov
Six songs, Op. 4, by Sergei Rachmaninoff (1873–1943)

Albums and EPs
Melvins! (album), also known as Six Songs, by the Melvins (1986)
6 Songs, an album by The Offspring

See also
Six Songs from A Shropshire Lad (1911) by George Butterworth
6 Songs for Bruce, a 1985 demo cassette by Soundgarden
Six Songs with Mike Singing, a 1985 EP from Eye for an Eye (Corrosion of Conformity album)
Six Songs of Hellcity Trendkill, a 2002 EP by Private Line
Seis canciones españolas (1939), by Matilde Salvador i Segarra
Seis canciones del Alto Duero para voz y piano by Manuel Valls (1920–1984)
Seis Canciones Escolares  by María Luisa Sepúlveda (1898–1958)
Seis canciones españolas  by Miguel Ángel Coria (1937–2016)
Seis canciones portuguesas (1940–41), by Ernesto Halffter
Seis canciones Castellanas by Conrado del Campo(1878–1953)
Seis canciones castellanas (Six Castilian Songs) (1939), by Jesús Guridi 
Six chansons pour piano (1950–51), by Iannis Xenakis
(6) Chansons de théâtre Op. 151b (1936), by Darius Milhaud